Parikhan (also Romanized as Parīkhān and Perī Khān; also known as Pīrī Khān) is a village in Dasht Rural District, in the Central District of Meshgin Shahr County, Ardabil Province, Iran. At the 2006 census, its population was 3,527, in 803 families.

References 

Towns and villages in Meshgin Shahr County